Michael Jordan to the Max is an IMAX documentary film released in 2000. The film is about the life and career of basketball player Michael Jordan, focusing mainly on his 1998 NBA Playoffs and other significant achievements in his career. It is narrated by Laurence Fishburne.

The film includes appearances by numerous celebrities and professional athletes including Phil Jackson, Doug Collins, Bob Costas, Bill Murray, Ken Griffey Jr., Steve Kerr, Spike Lee, Willie Mays, Stan Musial, Ahmad Rashad, and Pat Riley.

External links

2000 films
IMAX short films
Documentary films about basketball
Michael Jordan
Films scored by John Debney
IMAX documentary films
2000s English-language films
Films directed by James D. Stern